Plashet School is a secondary girls school in East Ham, London with approximately 1,350 students. It was previously a grammar school. In 2009 Ofsted highlighted Plashet as one of 12 outstanding schools serving disadvantaged communities.

History
Plashet dates back to 1932 when the East Ham Grammar School for Girls first opened on the South site.  In the 1950s, the North site was built and Plashet County Secondary Modern School for Girls was opened.  These two schools were amalgamated into Plashet School in 1972 and the two sites were physically linked by the Plashet Unity Bridge in November 2000. This was designed so students had a safer way to get to and from lessons without skipping school or getting into accidents.

In 1993, Bushra Nasir became Head Teacher.  She was the first Muslim woman teacher to become head of a UK comprehensive school. She is the President of the Muslim Teachers Association, and was appointed a CBE in 2003 and Professional of the Year at the 2005 Asian Women of Achievement awards.

Location
East Ham tube station and High Street North are within 5 minutes' walk of the school, and it draws students from across the London Borough of Newham and from neighbouring boroughs.

Plashet school topped the state school rankings in 2008 when it also got an excellent report from Ofsted and was also recognised by the international school standards. There are 1,350 students on roll, with a 10 form entry in each year group.

There are approximately 80 full-time teaching staff complemented by a team of English as a Second Language teachers, Special Needs teachers and classroom assistants. The students are offered a wide range of extra-curricular activities to enhance their learning and enjoyment.

Notable former pupils
Lyn Brown (politician) - Labour MP for West Ham from 2005.
Roshonara Choudhry - Islamist convicted of the attempted murder of MP Stephen Timms in 2010.
Baroness Uddin - first female Muslim in the House of Lords who came to prominence for her role in the parliamentary expenses scandal.
Rokhsana Fiaz - Mayor of Newham since 2018.

References

External links
 Official website

Secondary schools in the London Borough of Newham
Girls' schools in London
Community schools in the London Borough of Newham
East Ham